OSC may refer to:

Organizations 
 Odborové sdružení československé, the Czechoslovak Trade Union Association
 Office of Special Counsel (in the United States of America)
 Ohio Supercomputer Center, a computing research facility in Columbus
 Onslow County Schools, a school district in Onslow County, North Carolina
 Ontario Science Centre, a science museum in Toronto, Canada
 Ontario Securities Commission, a securities regulatory agency
 Open Source Center, a United States government center that provides analysis of open-source intelligence
 Open Source Consortium, The UK Open Source trade association
 Orbital Sciences Corporation, a satellite-oriented company
 Order of Saint Clare, a Religious Order founded by Clare of Assisi whose members use the post-nominal letters O.S.C.
 Ordo Sanctae Crucis or Canons Regular of the Order of the Holy Cross, a Roman Catholic religious order commonly called Crosiers
 Orlando Science Center, a science-education establishment in Florida
 Overseas School of Colombo, a multinational English medium international school located in Colombo, Sri Lanka.

Computing 
 Open Sound Control, a music-oriented electronic communications protocol used in computers and multimedia devices
 openSUSE Command-line tool, a command-line tool used for openSUSE build service
 Orthogonal signal correction, a spectral preprocessing technique
 Operating system command, one of the C0 and C1 control codes
 Optical Signature Code, an industry standard format for LWIR signatures.

Other 
 Off-site construction, a mode of construction
 Osceola (Amtrak station), Iowa, United States; Amtrak station code OSC
 Orson Scott Card, author of speculative fiction
 Organic solar cell
 Oscoda–Wurtsmith Airport (IATA code) - Michigan, United States
 Order to show cause